Kats or KATS may refer to:

 KATS, a radio station (94.5 FM) licensed to Yakima, Washington, USA
 Kats, Netherlands, a town in the Dutch province of Zeeland
 The Kats, a 1970s American band
 Korean Agency for Technology and Standards
 Kats, Armenia, now known as Astghadzor
 Artesia Municipal Airport (ICAO: KATS), New Mexico, USA
 Nashville Kats, an Arena Football League team

See also
 Kat (disambiguation)
 Katz (disambiguation), including the surname
 Katsu (disambiguation)